Ram Island or Ram's Island may refer to:

Australia
 Ram Island (Tasmania)
 Ram Island (Victoria)

Indonesia 
 Ram Island (Indonesia), in West Papua

United Kingdom
 Ram's Island, Northern Ireland

United States
 Ram Island (Connecticut), in Connecticut, United States
 Ram Island (Massachusetts), in the Merrimack River, Massachusetts, United States
 Ram Island, also called Big Ram Island, in New York, United States, joined by causeway to Shelter Island
 Ram Island (Washington), part of the San Juan Islands, Washington, United States

Maine
 Ram Island (Booth Bay), in Booth Bay, Maine, near Fisherman's Island, south of Ocean Point
 Its lighthouse, Ram Island Light
 Ram Island (Casco Bay), in Casco Bay, Maine, United States, close to the Ram Island Ledge
 Its lighthouse, Ram Island Ledge Light
 Ram Island (Saco Bay), off Saco, Maine, owned by the University of New England